Batesburg Commercial Historic District is a national historic district located at Batesburg-Leesville, Lexington County, South Carolina. It encompasses 28 contributing buildings in the central business district of Batesburg. It largely consists of brick commercial buildings built between 1895 and 1925, with the majority dating from 1900–1910. Notable buildings include the Old Telephone Company, M. Howard Butcher Shop, Owen Drug Company, Bank of Western Carolina, Old First National Bank, Belk's, and the M. E. Rutland Building.

It was listed on the National Register of Historic Places in 1982.

References

Commercial buildings on the National Register of Historic Places in South Carolina
Historic districts on the National Register of Historic Places in South Carolina
Buildings and structures in Lexington County, South Carolina
National Register of Historic Places in Lexington County, South Carolina